Wolfgang "Zabba" Lindner was a German drummer and composer.

He came to Hamburg with his family via Mannheim in the early 1960s. His father Max Lindner was the first drummer in the NDR Symphony Orchestra led by Hand Schmidt-Isserstedtd and Günther Wand for more than 20 years.

Lindner played jazz and rock, taught seminars at schools, gave workshops and worked in the crossover area. He wrote several symphonies, i.e. the "Mountain Rock Symphony" and performed in Bad Reichenhall and Berchtesgaden in 2003/2004 together with the Philharmonic Orchestra Bad Reichenhall and the Junge Philharmonie Salzburg. He also played together with acts such as Sphinx Tush, Tomorrow's Gift, Release Music Orchestra, the Even Mind Orchestra, ES, and Full Service.

While living in Hamburg, Lindner formed the duo The Two with saxophonist Kurt Buschmann. Since January 2016, Lindner was performing concerts of his compositions "Melodies of the Hamburg Symphony".

Discography (selection)

Tomorrow's Gift 
1973: Goodbye Future (fried egg)

Release Music Orchestra 
1974: Life ([[Brain]])

1975: Garuda (Brain)

1976: Get The Ball (Brain)

ES 
1979: Wham Bang (Fran Records)

Zabba Lindner & The Rhythm 'Stix 
1982: Extra Ordinaire (Sky Records)

References

External links 
 Short portrait (Krautrock)
 Drum legend Zabba Lindner
 Zabba Lindner at Discogs

1949 births
2017 deaths
German male composers
German male musicians
People from Köthen (Anhalt)